Juliette Danielle Worden (born December 8, 1980) is an American actress best known for portraying Lisa, the love interest of Johnny in the 2003 film The Room.

Career

The Room
Danielle was the female lead in Tommy Wiseau's cult film The Room in which she plays the protagonist Johnny's (Wiseau) scheming fiancée, Lisa, although she was originally cast for the supporting role of Michelle.

The film was initially a notable failure, receiving abysmal reviews and exceedingly low box office returns. Shortly after the film, Danielle gave up acting to pursue other careers. However, the film went on to achieve cult success in various late night screenings, celebrating its disjointed dialog and inconsistent plot. Like many of the film's other actors, including Wiseau himself and Greg Sestero, Danielle has embraced the following that the movie has achieved around the world, attending screenings and managing and using her Facebook page to interact with her fans.

Her favorite line from the movie is "Leave your stupid comments in your pocket."

One of her most notable scenes is during a conversation with the character Michelle, when a pronounced bulge on her neck appears several times under her red halter top. That particular scene has been focused on in commentary and audience viewings. Danielle was puzzled by the phenomenon saying, "Can I just tell you that I've spent hours in front of the mirror trying to replicate that on purpose? I have no idea what was going on."

Return to acting
In 2012, Danielle returned to acting and appeared in Dead Kansas, Ghost Shark 2: Urban Jaws and Till Morning.

Personal life
Danielle spent most of her early life in Sugar Land, Texas, a suburb of Houston. She moved with her mother and sister to Los Angeles in the early 2000s and decided to pursue an acting career.  In 2017, the actress moved to San Antonio to be closer to her family.

Portrayal in The Disaster Artist 
The 2017 film The Disaster Artist, starring James Franco, dramatizes the events around the making of The Room. Danielle is portrayed by Ari Graynor, though Britney Spears was briefly considered for the role.

Filmography

References

External links 

1980 births
Living people
21st-century American actresses
People from Fort Smith, Arkansas
21st-century American women